Estádio Alfredo Marques Augusto is a stadium in Lisbon, Portugal.  It is currently used mostly for football matches and it is the home stadium of CD Olivais e Moscavide. The stadium is able to hold 2,730 people. 

Moscavide station of the Lisbon Metro is located in Rua João Pinto Ribeiro at the north end of the stadium.

Alfredo Marques Augusto
Sports venues in Lisbon District